The law of the Hong Kong Special Administrative Region has its foundation in the English common law system, inherited from being a former British colony and dependent territory. There are several sources of law, the primary ones being statutes enacted by the Legislative Council of Hong Kong and case law made by decisions of the courts of Hong Kong.

Since the handover in 1997, the constitutional framework is provided by the Hong Kong Basic Law, which is a piece of National Law of the People's Republic of China and has, practically, constitutional status in Hong Kong. The principle of ‘one country, two systems’ was enshrined in Article 5 of the Basic Law until at least 2047, which contrasts the ‘socialist system and policies’ and ‘the previous capitalist system and way of life’.

The Basic Law provides that the common law system shall be maintained. Some commentators described the theoretically hybrid system of civil law and common law as unique, although there are similar arrangements all over the world. Other commentators point to the socialist law tradition instead of the civil law tradition.

Primary legislation in Hong Kong are usually known as ‘Ordinances’, instead of ‘Acts’. The published, consolidated copies of Ordinances are given chapter numbers in Laws of Hong Kong and in the official online database.

Some National Laws on foreign affairs and the national flag apply directly in Hong Kong by virtue of stipulations in Article 18 and Annex III of the Basic Law. The imposition of the National Law on Safeguarding National Security in the HKSAR has been authorized by a National People's Congress Decision which, in a practical sense, overrides the Basic Law.

History and the Basic Law 
Hong Kong's legal system was developed under British governance, based on the English common law. Under British rule, the constitutional documents that governed Hong Kong were the Letters Patent and the Royal Instructions, and judicial cases were generally appealable to the Judicial Committee of the Privy Council in the UK.

In the 1984 Sino-British Joint Declaration, the UK and the PRC mutually agreed that Hong Kong would be returned to China after 1997. Hong Kong would be governed by the "one country, two systems" principle, under which Hong Kong's previous capitalist system and way of life, including the legal system, would remain unchanged for a period of 50 years until 2047.

The Hong Kong Basic Law, which is a law passed by the Chinese National People's Congress, came into effect in 1997, becoming the constitutional document in Hong Kong. The law was passed in accordance with Article 31 of the Chinese Constitution, which authorized the establishment of Special Administrative Regions. The Basic Law sets out the status of Hong Kong as a Special Administrative Region of the PRC, the one country, two systems principle, the political structure of Hong Kong, and the rights of duties of Hong Kong residents.

Legal areas

Administrative law 

Administrative law in Hong Kong is heavily modelled on its counterpart in England and Wales, especially the law of judicial review.  This applies both to the procedure and grounds of judicial review, though there is some divergence in various areas.  Some aspects of administrative law, for example administrative tribunals, were originally modelled on their counterparts in England and Wales but have not been systematically reformed for decades.

Constitutional law 

The Hong Kong Basic Law contains the essentials of the constitutional framework in the Hong Kong Special Administrative Region. Article 8 stipulates that all laws in force before 1997, including

the common law, rules of equity, ordinances, subordinate legislation and customary law shall be maintained, except for any that contravene this Law, and subject to any amendment by the legislature of the Hong Kong Special Administrative Region.

Article 18 states, further, that national laws, from the People's Republic of China do not apply, except for a specific list in Annex III to the Basic Law, to which the Standing Committee of the National People's Congress can add or delete what it chooses. However, this may only be in the fields of "defence and foreign affairs as well as other matters outside the limits of the autonomy of the Region as specified by this Law". It also has a derogation, in a war situation, for a state of emergency to be declared.

Hence, the laws in force are in hierarchical order are The Hong Kong Basic Law; legislation in force before 1 July 1997 that was adopted as laws of the HKSAR by the Standing Committee of the National People's Congress; laws enacted by the Legislative Council of Hong Kong after 1997; and PRC laws listed in Annex III to the Basic Law and applied by way of promulgation or legislation; common law and equity; subordinate legislation; customary law.

Currently, twelve PRC laws apply in the HKSAR. These national laws apply in Hong Kong by the Hong Kong legislature legislating on the same matter: for example, the Law of the People's Republic of China on the National Flag, a Chinese statute, takes effect in Hong Kong in form of the National Flag and National Emblem Ordinance, a local statute enacted by the local legislature.

The Basic Law contains provisions that offer protection for human rights. Any laws that contravene the Basic Law are unconstitutional and are of no effect. Hong Kong has a Bill of Rights Ordinance which is the local adaptation of the International Covenant of Civil and Political Rights. Laws have been passed to ensure the human rights protected in the Basic Law and the Bill of Rights, such as the Personal Data (Privacy) Ordinance, Disability Discrimination Ordinance, Family Status Discrimination Ordinance, Sex Discrimination Ordinance and Race Discrimination Ordinance.

Criminal law

Family law 
Family law in Hong Kong is heavily modelled on its counterpart in England and Wales with important modifications.

Ancillary relief
Hong Kong does not have a statutory matrimonial property regime. There is no system of "community of property" and property rights are not in principle affected by marriage. Instead, the family courts have very broad discretion to make a range of financial orders upon a decree of divorce pursuant to the "Matrimonial Proceedings and Property Ordinance (Cap 192)", namely for: periodical payments, secured periodical payments, lump sum payments, transfers or sale of property, settlement of property (into a trust), and variation of settlements. Similarly, there are powers to make orders for maintenance pending suit once divorce proceedings have begun. These are interim measures that will end once the final divorce decree is granted. In making final financial orders in favour of a spouse, courts are guided by four principles: (i) the objective of fairness, (ii) rejection of discrimination, (iii) the yardstick of equal division, and (iv) rejection of minute retrospective investigation (see "LKW v DD" [2010] HKCFA 70; [2010] 6 HKC 528). They are also required to consider the following non-exhaustive list of factors (see section 7(1) of the Matrimonial Proceedings and Property Ordinance (Cap 192).

Child custody
The family courts have broad jurisdiction to deal with the welfare of children under the provisions of the "Guardianship of Minors Ordinance (Cap 13)", the "Separation and Maintenance Orders Ordinance (Cap 16)", the "Matrimonial Causes Ordinance (Cap 179)" and the "Matrimonial Proceedings and Property Ordinance (Cap 192)". Additionally, the High Court's has broad powers under its inherent jurisdiction including wardship. In parental disputes, generally the courts are concerned with making orders for custody, care and control, and access. These orders are distinct from questions of financial responsibility for children (i.e. "maintenance"). Access is the right to have contact with the child, it may be unsupervised or supervised (i.e. where there are concerns about the impact of contact on the child); undefined (sometimes "reasonable" or "generous") or defined (i.e. at times specified in the order); staying (a.k.a. overnight) or "day-time". Care and control is the right to make day-to-day decisions about the child; it should not be confused with "shared care" and the notion of the primary caregiver. Custody is the right to make all important decisions affecting the child and it is generally awarded to one parent ("sole custody") or shared between both parents ("joint custody"): see "PD v KWW (Joint Custody, Care and Control)" [2010] 4 HKLRD 191; [2010] HKCA 172.

The paramount consideration for the court is always the welfare (or "best interests") of the child; this is known as the Welfare Principle (see section 3 of Cap 13). In determining the best interests of the child, the court will generally have regard to the Welfare Checklist, i.e. the ascertainable wishes and feelings of the child concerned (considered in the light of the child's age and understanding); the physical, emotional and educational needs of the child; the likely effect on the child of any change in the child's circumstances; the child's age, sex, background and any characteristics of the child's which the court considers relevant; any harm the child has suffered or is at risk of suffering; how capable each of the parents, and any other person in relation to whom the court considers the question to be relevant, is of meeting the child's needs; the range of powers available to the court in the proceedings in question; and the general principle that any delay is likely to prejudice the welfare of the child: see "H v N [2012] 5 HKLRD 498; [2012] HKCFI 1533".

Divorce
The jurisdiction of the family courts to deal with divorce, separation and nullity of marriage is set out in the "Separation and Maintenance Orders Ordinance (Cap 16)" and the "Matrimonial Causes Ordinance (Cap 179)".

Procedure and evidence

Business associations

Companies Registry
The Companies Registry is responsible for administering and enforcing the Companies Ordinance and several other related ordinances. Its primary functions include the incorporation of local companies; the registration of oversea companies; the registration of documents required to be submitted by registered companies; the deregistration of defunct, solvent private companies; the prosecution of companies and their officers for breaches of the various regulatory provisions of the Companies Ordinance; the provision of facilities to inspect and obtain company information; and advising the Government on policy and legislative issues regarding company law and related legislation, including the Overall Review of the Companies Ordinance.

Official Receiver's Office
When appointed by the court and creditors, the Official Receiver is responsible for the proper and orderly administration of the estates of insolvent companies ordered to be wound up by the court under the winding-up provisions of the Companies Ordinance and of individuals or partners declared bankrupt by the court under the Bankruptcy Ordinance.

Labour law

Property law

The Land Registry

The Land Registry administers the Land Registration Ordinance governing the system of land registration and provides facilities for search of the Land Register and related records by the public and government departments. It has responsibility for the registration of owners corporations under the Building Management Ordinance.

Legal Advisory and Conveyancing Office
The Legal Advisory and Conveyancing Office (LACO, 法律諮詢及田土轉易處) is part of the Lands Department. It provides legal advice primarily to the Lands Administration Office of the Lands Department and other government departments on land related matters and ordinances. LACO is responsible for drafting and settling government land disposal and lease modification documents. LACO is also responsible for the preparation of documentation relating to the acquisition of land from private owners pursuant to statutory powers and the payment of compensation to those owners. LACO administers the Lands Department Consent Scheme to approve applications by developers to sell flats in uncompleted developments. It also approves Deeds of Mutual Covenant requiring approval under land leases. LACO also provides conveyancing services to the Financial Secretary Incorporated for the extension of non-renewable leases, the Government Property Agency for the sale and purchase of government properties and the Secretary for Home Affairs Incorporated for the purchase of accommodation for welfare purposes in private developments. It handles applications for the apportionment of premium and government rents under the Government Rent and Premium (Apportionment) Ordinance. In addition, it is responsible for the recovery of arrears of government rents other than rents under the Government Rent (Assessment and Collection) Ordinance.

Intellectual Property Department
The Intellectual Property Department serves as the focal point for intellectual property policy, law and acquisition and public education on intellectual property protection. It provides expert policy advice to the Commerce, Industry and Technology Bureau and legal advice to other government departments on intellectual property. It comments on draft intellectual property bills. It operates the registries of trade marks, patents and designs. It is also responsible for registration of copyright licensing bodies.

 Hong Kong copyright law
 Hong Kong trade mark law
 Patent law in Hong Kong

Obligations

International co-operation
Under the Basic Law, the HKSAR has a high degree of autonomy in external affairs. With the authority of the Central People's Government where necessary, it has concluded more than a hundred bilateral agreements with other jurisdictions. In addition, over 200 multilateral international conventions are applicable to the HKSAR. Using the name "Hong Kong, China", the HKSAR also participates on its own as a full member in international organisations and conferences not limited to states, e.g. the World Trade Organization, the World Customs Organization, the Asia-Pacific Economic Cooperation, etc. As part of the delegation of the People's Republic of China, representatives of the HKSAR Government participate in activities of the Hague Conference, as well as of other international organisations and conferences limited to states, such as the International Monetary Fund, the World Intellectual Property Organization and the International Civil Aviation Organization.

Institutions

The judiciary

It is fundamental to Hong Kong's legal system that members of the judiciary are independent of the executive and legislative branches of government. The courts of justice in Hong Kong are the Court of Final Appeal, the High Court (which includes the Court of Appeal and the Court of First Instance), the District Court (which includes the Family Court), the Lands Tribunal, the Magistrates' Court (which include the Juvenile Court), the Coroner's Court, the Labour Tribunal, the Small Claims Tribunal and the Obscene Articles Tribunal.

Department of Justice

The Department of Justice (DOJ) It consists of five professional divisions responsible for legal work. It is headed by the Secretary for Justice, who is a member of the Executive Council and is the Government's chief legal adviser. He has ultimate responsibility for the prosecution of all offences in the HKSAR.
 The Legal Policy Division, as well as the Secretary for Justice's Office, provides professional support to the Secretary for Justice in the execution of her duties and provides input on all legal policy issues being considered by the Government. The division advises on issues relating to the administration of justice, the legal system, the legal profession, human rights, the Basic Law and the law of Mainland China.  The Law Reform Commission Secretariat, which provides research and secretarial support to The Law Reform Commission of Hong Kong, is within the division.
 The Civil Division provides legal advice to the Government on civil law, drafts commercial contracts and franchises and conducts civil litigation, arbitration and mediation on behalf of the Government.
 The Law Drafting Division is responsible for drafting all legislation, including subsidiary legislation, in Chinese and English, and assists in steering legislation through the Executive and Legislative Councils. It also has editorial responsibility for the Laws of Hong Kong and for maintaining an up-to-date version of those laws in the Bilingual Laws Information System, a computer database which is available free to the public on the Internet.
 The Prosecutions Division, headed by the Director of Public Prosecution, prosecutes trials and appeals on behalf of the HKSAR and generally exercises the Secretary for Justice's discretion whether or not to bring criminal proceedings against a person. It conducts most criminal appeals up to and including the Court of Final Appeal. It also conduct the majority of trials in the Court of First Instance and the District Court and, when necessary, it prosecutes in the Magistrates’ Court. The division also provides legal advice to law enforcement agencies and other government departments on the criminal law aspects of any proposed legislation.
 The International Law Division advises the Government on issues relating to public international law. Lawyers in this division also participate in the negotiation of agreements with other jurisdictions and handle requests to and from the HKSAR for international legal co-operation.

Law Reform Commission
The Law Reform Commission considers and reports on such topics as may be referred to it by the Secretary for Justice or the Chief Justice of the Court of Final Appeal of the HKSAR. Its membership includes academics, practising lawyers and prominent community members. The commission has published reports covering subjects as diverse as commercial arbitration, data protection, divorce, sale of goods and supply of services, insolvency, fraud and statutory interpretation. The recommendations in many of its reports have been implemented, either in whole or in part. It is currently considering references on privacy, guardianship and custody, domicile, privity of contract, advance directives, hearsay in criminal proceedings and conditional fees.

The legal profession

In Hong Kong, the legal profession consists of both solicitors and barristers. As of 31 December 2015, there were at least 8,647 practising solicitors and 777 local law firms, plus some 77 foreign law firms, 1,299 registered foreign lawyers. And there were at least 1,378 practising barristers in 135 chambers.

Even prior to the transfer of sovereignty of Hong Kong, Hong Kong's legal profession was open to foreign law firms allowing foreign firms to establish a much earlier foothold in Hong Kong than in the People's Republic of China. Only on 1 July 1992, in contrast, did the PRC government open her legal services market to foreign law firms when the Ministry of Justice issued the Provisional Regulation of Establishment of Offices by Foreign Law Firms regulation.
Thus all of the Magic Circle law firms as well as major U.S. law firms have large presences in Hong Kong.

While foreign law firms face much less strict regulations than they would in the People's Republic of China due to the "one country, two systems" rule, they have seen increasing competition from local firms as PRC firms have become more sophisticated. According to Asia Law & Business, the top foreign Hong Kong law firm of 2007 was Johnson Stokes & Master (now Mayer Brown JSM) while the top PRC law firm was King & Wood PRC Lawyers. Chinese firms have seen rapid growth in Hong Kong in the past several years after reunification.

The legal bodies governing the conduct of solicitors and barristers are the Law Society of Hong Kong and the Hong Kong Bar Association, respectively. There are currently three law schools offering the Postgraduate Certificate in Laws, required for starting work as a trainee solicitor or pupil barrister.

Legal Aid Department
The Director of Legal Aid is responsible for the administration of Home Affairs Bureau after 1 July 2007. Eligible persons are provided with legal representation depending on their financial circumstances.

Civil cases
Legal aid is available for civil proceedings in the District Court, the Court of First Instance and the Court of Appeal (both part of the High Court), and the Court of Final Appeal. It also covers proceedings in some tribunals and certain Coroner's Court cases. An applicant must satisfy both a 'means test' and a 'merits test'. For the means test, a person whose total financial resources do not exceed $155,800 may be granted legal aid. The Director of Legal Aid may waive the upper financial limit in meritorious cases when a breach of the Hong Kong Bill of Rights or inconsistency with the International Covenant on Civil and Political Rights as applied to Hong Kong is an issue. For the merits test, the Director must be satisfied that an applicant has reasonable grounds for bringing or defending the civil proceedings to which the application relates. A person aggrieved by a decision of the Director may appeal to the Registrar of the High Court.

Criminal cases
Legal aid is available for committal proceedings in the Magistrates' Courts; cases tried in the District Court and the Court of First Instance of the High Court; and appeals from the Magistrates' Courts, and to the Court of Appeal of the High Court or the Court of Final Appeal. An applicant must satisfy the means test criteria which are the same as for civil cases. Notwithstanding that an applicant's financial resources exceed the statutory limit, the Director of Legal Aid may grant legal aid to the applicant if the Director is satisfied that it is desirable in the interests of justice to do so. However, in appeal cases, the Director of Legal Aid must be satisfied that there are meritorious grounds for appeal with a reasonable prospect of success. Notwithstanding the refusal of a legal aid application by the Director of Legal Aid, a judge may himself grant aid if the applicant has satisfied the means test. Applicants in cases involving a charge of murder, treason, or piracy with violence may apply to a judge for granting of legal aid, and exemption from the means test and from payment of contribution.

Supplementary Legal Aid Scheme
This scheme provides legal representation to the sandwich class whose financial resources are above the upper eligibility limit for legal aid (i.e. $155,800) but do not exceed $432,900. It covers cases involving personal injury or death, as well as medical, dental or legal professional negligence, where the claim for damages is likely to exceed $60,000. The scheme also covers claims under the Employees' Compensation Ordinance irrespective of the amount of the claim.

The Duty Lawyer Service
Three programmes of legal assistance, jointly administered by the Law Society and the Bar Association of Hong Kong, are subvented by the Government. The Duty Lawyer Scheme rosters barristers and solicitors in private practice to appear in the Magistrates and Juvenile Courts on a remunerated basis. The scheme provides representation to all juveniles (defendants under 16) and to most adult defendants charged in the Magistrates' Courts who cannot afford private representation. The defendants are required to pay a handling charge of $570 upon granting of Duty Lawyer representation. In 2018, 22,546 defendants were assisted. The Free Legal Advice Scheme, staffed by over 1,126 volunteer lawyers, operates 12 sessions per week at nine evening centres. In 2018, 6,953 cases were handled. The scheme is not means tested. A free Tel-Law Service offers trilingual (Cantonese, Putonghua and English) taped information on 80 topics. Eight telephone lines operate 24 hours. In 2018, 16,439 calls were received.

See also
 Legal systems of the world
 Judiciary of Hong Kong
 Law of the People's Republic of China
 Legal system of Macao
 Hong Kong Basic Law
 Hong Kong national security law

References

External links
 The Legal System in Hong Kong from the Hong Kong Department of Justice (2004).
 Hong Kong e-Legislation
 Full text of the Basic Law
 Government Gazette
 Law Reform Commission of Hong Kong
 Basic Law Drafting History Online -University of Hong Kong Libraries, Digital Initiatives
 Historical Laws of Hong Kong Online - University of Hong Kong Libraries, Digital Initiatives
 Hong Kong Legal Information Institute (HKLII) - a project of China IT & Law Centre
"Hong Kong Family Court Tables" published by the Hong Kong Family Law Association, includes summary of Hong Kong family law principles, a guide to the recent case law and relevant statutes, and a glossary of relevant terms related to the Hong Kong family law. 
 Comprehensive Hong Kong Law Resource - Resources, Articles, News, Discussions & Legal Directory
 The Sino-British Joint Declaration
 Basic Law Bulletin
 

 
Judiciary of Hong Kong
Politics of Hong Kong